The Movement was a political movement in Iceland.  It had three members of parliament in the Icelandic Parliament, the Althing.  All of them were former Citizens' Movement (CM) MPs.

Þór Saari, economist
Margrét Tryggvadóttir, editor
Birgitta Jónsdóttir, poet, editor and artist

The original Citizen's Movement had four members of parliament. However, since one MP, Þráinn Bertelsson, had already left the party in the summer of 2009, none remain. On March 18, 2012, it merged with Citizens' Movement and the Liberal Party to form a new political party called Dawn.

References

External links
 Party website

2009 establishments in Iceland
2012 disestablishments in Iceland
Defunct political parties in Iceland
Political parties disestablished in 2012
Political parties established in 2009